A hash filter creates a hash sum from data, typically e-mail, and compares the sum against other previously defined sums. Depending on the purpose of the filter, the data can then be included or excluded in a function based on whether it matches an existing sum.

For example, when a message is received by an e-mail server with a hash filter, the contents of the e-mail is converted into a hash sum. If this sum corresponds to the hash sum of another e-mail which has been categorized as spam, the received e-mail is prevented from being delivered. Spammers attempt to evade this by adding random strings to the text content and random pixel changes ("confetti") to image content (see image spam).

See also
 Bloom filter
 Hash buster
 Locality-sensitive hashing

References
Hash Filter algorithm (SQL Anywhere Server - SQL Usage) at iAnywhere.com

Hash functions